David John Rowlands is a Welsh politician, who was a Member of the Senedd (MS) for South Wales East from 2016 to 2021. Elected as an MS for  the UK Independence Party (UKIP), Rowlands joined the Brexit Party in 2019. He joined  the Independent Alliance for Reform in October 2020.

Biography 

Born in the Welsh mining town of Argoed, he was educated at Pontllanfraith Grammar School obtaining A Levels in economics and geography before studying for a degree in business studies. Rowlands joined UKIP in 1998.

Formerly a UK Independence Party (UKIP) Assembly Member, Rowlands resigned to join the Brexit Party in May 2019.

In mid October 2020 he formed a new group in the Senedd, the Independent Alliance for Reform, together with fellow MSs Mandy Jones and Caroline Jones.

Electoral history 
During his time in UKIP, Rowlands contested numerous seats for the party in General, Assembly, local and European elections.

He contested New Inn ward in Torfaen in the 2004 Welsh local election, where he won 811 votes.

In the 2015 UK General election, Rowlands stood as the UKIP candidate for Merthyr Tydfil and Rhymney. 
He won 18.7% of the vote, therefore retaining his deposit. 

He contested Merthyr Tydfil & Rhymney in the 2016 National Assembly for Wales election. He won 4,277 votes, finishing second to Welsh Labour's Dawn Bowden. In the same election, Rowlands was elected as a Assembly Member for the South Wales East, alongside fellow UKIP candidate, Mark Reckless.

In the 2017 UK General election, Rowlands stood again for Merthyr Tydfil and Rhymney. He came fourth with 1,484 votes, a reduction in his previous vote share.

In the 2021 Senedd election,  Rowlands again stood on the list for South Wales East, this time for Reform UK, and also stood as the party’s candidate for  Newport East. He was unsuccessful, as were all other Reform and UKIP candidates in that election.

Westminster Parliament elections

European Parliament elections

Welsh Assembly elections (Constituency Seats)

Welsh Assembly elections (Regional Seats)

References

Year of birth missing (living people)
Living people
UK Independence Party members of the Senedd
Reform UK members of the Senedd
Wales MSs 2016–2021
People from Caerphilly
Welsh politicians